Eshtuj or Oshtuj, also rendered as Eshtukh, may refer to:
 Bala Eshtuj
 Pain Eshtuj